Hatun Urqu (Quechua hatun big, urqu, mountain, "big mountain", Hispanicized spelling Jatunorcco) is a mountain in the Huancavelica Region in Peru, about  high. Hatun Urqu lies south of the mountain Yana Urqu ("black mountain", Hispanicized Yanaorcco). Between these mountains there is an intermittent stream. It flows to the river Qullpamach'ay ("salpeter cave", Jollpamachay) south of Hatun Urqu.

References 

Mountains of Peru
Mountains of Huancavelica Region